Camboinhas is one of the 48 neighborhoods into which the city of Niterói, in Brazil, is divided.

The name originated in a marine accident in the 1950s.  In that decade, a ship called Camboinhas grounded on the beach. A Brazilian Navy corvette named "Angostura" was sent to save the ship, but grounded during her attempts to tow "Camboinhas" out of the beach. The Navy then abandoned their attempts to salvage the "Camboinhas" and concentrated all efforts on saving the "Angostura", which they eventually succeeded in doing. Today, the remains of the hull of the Camboinhas can be seen on the beach, during low tide.

The neighborhood has shores on both the Itaipu Lagoon and the Atlantic Ocean and was inhabited primarily by fishermen until 1978, when a company named Veplan started lotting the land for the real estate market.  Between the years of 1980 and 1991, the place experienced a population growth rate of 14.84% per year, leading the city's statistics in that category.  As a result, in 1991 it had a population of 926, which equals 0.21% of the total population of the municipality.

On the Atlantic shore, the place is marked by typical vegetation of the region, with sand dunes and restinga vegetation.

In terms of occupation, the area is dominated by middle and upper-class family residences.  95.51% of the houses have plumbing.

Tourism: the views of Rio de Janeiro from this beach are some of the most beautiful around. It's a wonderful place to spend the day.  It's about a 1 hr drive from Rio. The beach is not very crowded at all during the week, it's very swimmable and walkable, there are kiosks/little restaurants right on the beach serving snacks, full meals (great seafood) and cold drinks.  It's worth staying for the gorgeous sunsets.

Neighbourhoods of Niterói